The Col. James Graham House is a historic log cabin located on West Virginia Route 3 in Lowell, West Virginia. It was built in 1770 as a home for Col. James Graham, the first settler of Lowell, and his family. It was later the site of an Indian attack on the Graham family in 1777. The house was added to the National Register of Historic Places on March 16, 1976. The Graham House is the oldest multi-story log cabin in West Virginia. It is currently operating as a museum.

History
James Graham and his family built the cabin in 1770 after migrating to the area from elsewhere in Virginia. As the Grahams were the first permanent settlers in the region, the Graham House became the first established home in what is now Summers County. The log house, with a  exterior, was significantly larger than other pioneer cabins of the period. The Graham family settled into a life of farming in the home upon its completion. In 1777, Indians attacked the Graham House, killing Col. Graham's son John, a neighbor of the Grahams named McDonald, and a young slave boy as well as kidnapping Col. Graham's daughter Elizabeth. The family did not successfully ransom Elizabeth until 1785.

The Graham House remained in the Graham family until 1860. After 1860, several other families inhabited the cabin, including Col. Wilson Lively's family and Mr. and Mrs. Lewis E. Barickman. The last residents of the house (from 1976 - 1986) were Eileen and Bill Muhly, Jr. and their six children. The youngest two, twins Mary Elizabeth and James Arthur Bertram were born while the family resided there. The house is currently owned by the Graham House Preservation Society and operated as a museum.

Description
The Graham House is notable as being a particularly large house compared to other log cabins of the period. The house is built of poplar, walnut, and oak logs, with stones used as additional supports. Large stone chimneys are located at either end of the house. The house was likely built with a single door and no windows, but an additional door and several windows were added at a later date. The first floor consists of a single room, and at one point was split into three rooms; the second floor has three rooms. The house's original outbuildings were eventually replaced by additions on the north side of the house, the latest of which was built in the 1970s and includes bathing and kitchen areas.

Museum
The Graham House is currently operated as a private museum, with tours given during summer months on weekends. The house is also used as a venue for community events such as dinners, festivals, and reunions.

On the same property as the Graham House lies the Saunders One Room School House Museum. The school house, while not an original school building, allows visitors to see an example of a one-room school house. The property also houses a barn which contains many pieces of old farm equipment.

References

External links
Graham House Preservation Society

Houses on the National Register of Historic Places in West Virginia
Houses completed in 1770
Museums in Summers County, West Virginia
Historic house museums in West Virginia
Historic American Buildings Survey in West Virginia
National Register of Historic Places in Summers County, West Virginia
Houses in Summers County, West Virginia
1770 establishments in Virginia
Log buildings and structures on the National Register of Historic Places in West Virginia